Rashomama may refer to:
 An episode of CSI: Crime Scene Investigation
 An episode of Mama's Family

See also 
 Rashomon